Valerian Kuybyshev (born 3 December 1925 – 2006) was a Soviet equestrian. He competed at the 1952 Summer Olympics and the 1956 Summer Olympics.

References

External links
 

1925 births
2006 deaths
Soviet male equestrians
Olympic equestrians of the Soviet Union
Equestrians at the 1952 Summer Olympics
Equestrians at the 1956 Summer Olympics
Place of birth missing